Maxim Mihaliov (born 22 August 1986) is a Moldovan footballer who plays as a midfielder for Dinamo-Auto Tiraspol in the Moldovan National Division.

Club career
Mihaliov has only played club football in Moldova, except for one season in Israel. He started his career with local club Dinamo Bender. In the 2008–09 season, Mihaliov scored 12 goals in 29 games as Dinamo Bender ranked 5th in the table. He then transferred to Maccabi Herzliya in the Liga Leumit, where he only played four matches before returning to Moldova and Iskra-Stal. In the 2010–11 season, he won the league with Dacia Chișinău. He has later played for Dinamo-Auto Tiraspol and Zaria Bălți.

International career
Mihaliov made his international debut for Moldova on 24 March 2016 in a friendly match against Malta.

Honours
Dacia Chișinău
Moldovan National Division: 2010–11

References

External links

Profile at Divizia Nationala

1986 births
Living people
Association football midfielders
Moldovan footballers
Moldovan expatriate footballers
Expatriate footballers in Israel
Moldovan expatriate sportspeople in Israel
Moldova international footballers
FC Tighina players
Maccabi Herzliya F.C. players
FC Iskra-Stal players
FC Dacia Chișinău players
FC Dinamo-Auto Tiraspol players
CSF Bălți players
Moldovan Super Liga players
Liga Leumit players